The University of Cartagena, also called UniCartagena, is a departmental public coeducational research university based primarily in the city of Cartagena, Bolívar, Colombia. The university offers education at undergraduate and postgraduate levels, which includes two doctorates.

The university is member of the Association of Colombian Universities, the Iberoamerican Association of Postgraduate Universities, and the State University System. On March 26, 2014, the University of Cartagena received from the Ministry of Education Institutional Accreditation of High Quality, becoming the first and only public university in the Caribbean region with this type of accreditation.

History 
 

In 1826, General Francisco de Paula Santander's decree cleared the way for the creation of a university in the Caribbean Region of Colombia and was chosen to host Cartagena de Indias. On October 6, 1827, the Liberator Simon Bolivar formalized, thus was born the University of Magdalena and the Isthmus, because at that time Panama was part of Colombia. Subsequently, due to changes in territorial and political type, and University of Central Magdalena became the University of Cartagena in the Cloister of St. Augustine, then had only two undergraduate: Law and Medicine.

In the 1950s, they officially adopted the current shield of the university. In 1989, the university inaugurated the Health Campus, which moved the faculties of Medicine, Nursing, Dentistry and Pharmaceutical Chemistry. In 2001, he moved to Stone Bolivar Campus Faculty of Science and Engineering and in 2003 he moved to the same venue the faculty of Economics.

In 1993, the university established distance learning through the Regional Centers for Distance Education (CREAD). The U of C has programs in the municipalities of Simiti, South Santa Rosa, Carmen de Bolivar, San Estanislao, Turbaco, Carmen de Bolivar, and San Marcos Magangué.

Undergraduates

Faculty of Economic Sciences: Economics, Business, Industrial Management, and Accounting.
Faculty of Humanities: Philosophy, History, Linguistics and Literature.
Faculty of Engineering: Civil Engineering, Food Engineering, Chemical Engineering, Systems Engineering.
Faculty of Social Sciences: Social Communication, Social Work, Foreign Languages.
Faculty of Natural Sciences: Mathematics, Biology, Chemistry, Metrology.
Faculty of Pharmaceutical Sciences: Pharmaceutical Chemistry
Faculty of Law and Political Science: Law
School of Nursing: Nursing
School of Medicine: Medicine
School of Dentistry: Dentistry
School of Languages

Masters
Master's degrees are offered in the fields of:
Nursing, Mathematics, Chemistry, Physics, Education, Pharmaceutical Sciences, Environmental Sciences, Environmental Engineering, Biochemistry, Clinical Toxicology, Microbiology, Pharmacology, Clinical Epidemiology and Immunology, Philosophy.

Other studies
The University of Cartagena offers other graduate programs that do not meet the range of expertise and therefore do not give access to any PhD ( in Colombia to these types of programs are called specializations).

Campus
Zaragocilla Campus (Health Sciences)
Piedra de Bolívar Campus (Engineering and Economic Sciences)
Cloister of St. Augustine Campus (Main Campus)
Cloister of La Merced Campus (Historic town)

Institutes

Immunologic Research Institute.
International Institute of Caribbean Studies.
Institute of Water and Environmental Sanitation (IHSA).

Notable alumni

Politics
 Rafael Núñez – Lawyer, president of Colombia.
 Justo Arosemena Quesada – statesman and champion of Panamanian national identity.
Alfonso Múnera Cavadía – Colombian historian, ambassador, and past secretary general of the Association of Caribbean States.
 Manuel Amador Guerrero -Surgeon, promoted and achieved separation of Panama from Colombia and was the first president of the Republic of Panama.

Literature and journalism 
 Gabriel García Márquez -(Undergraduate) Nobel Prize for Literature, 1982 .
 John Jairo Junieles Lawyer, poet, winner of the National Literature Prize in 2002 City of Bogota, the International Poetry Prize City of Alajuela (Costa Rica) in 2005, and the X International Poetry Prize in 2007 Nicolas Guillen

References

Universities and colleges in Colombia
Educational institutions established in 1827
University of Cartagena
1827 establishments in Gran Colombia